Mixta calida (formerly Pantoea calida) is a species of Gram negative bacteria. Cells of this species are coccoid rods and are motile.

Background
Mixta calida was originally isolated from powdered infant formula, and in 2010 was placed in the genus Pantoea. In 2018, the species was reclassified into the novel genus, Mixta. The species name is derived from Latin calida (warm, hot), referring to the species' ability to grow well at 44 °C.

References

Gram-negative bacteria
Enterobacterales